Almonia is a genus of moths of the family Crambidae.

Classification
The Crambidae are the grass moth family of (butterflies and moths). They are quite variable in appearance, the nominal subfamily Crambinae (grass moths) taking up closely folded postures on grass-stems where they are inconspicuous, while other subfamilies include brightly colored and patterned insects which rest in wing-spread attitudes.

In many classifications, the Crambidae have been treated as a subfamily of the Pyralidae or snout-moths. The principal difference is a structure in the ears called the praecinctorium, which joins two tympanic membranes in the Crambidae, and is absent from the Pyralidae. It would seem to be a matter of personal opinion (therefore not susceptible to definitive decision) whether this distinction merits division into two families, or whether the common presence of ventrally-located ears should unify them into one family. The latest review by Munroe & Solis, in Kristensen (1999) retains the Crambidae as a full family.

Species
 Almonia atratalis Rothschild, 1915
 Almonia truncatalis Walker, [1866]

Former species
 Almonia cristata (Hampson, 1891)
 Almonia lobipennis (Moore, 1886)

References

Acentropinae
Crambidae genera
Taxa named by Francis Walker (entomologist)